"Cold turkey" refers to the abrupt cessation of a substance dependence and the resulting unpleasant experience, as opposed to gradually easing the process through reduction over time or by using replacement medication. 

Sudden withdrawal from drugs such as alcohol, benzodiazepines, and barbiturates can be extremely dangerous, leading to potentially fatal seizures. For long-term alcoholics, going cold turkey can cause life-threatening delirium tremens, rendering this an inappropriate method for breaking an alcohol addiction.

In the case of opioid withdrawal, going "cold turkey" is extremely unpleasant but less dangerous. Life-threatening issues are unlikely unless one has a pre-existing medical condition.

Smoking cessation methods advanced by J. Wayne McFarland and Elman J. Folkenburg (an M.D. and a pastor who wrote their Five Day Plan ca. 1959), Joel Spitzer and John R. Polito (smoking cessation educators) and Allen Carr (who founded Easyway during the early 1980s) are cold turkey plans.

Etymology 

The very first adaptation of the phrase "cold turkey" to its current meaning is a matter of some debate and ambiguity.

Scholars of 19th-century British periodicals have pointed to the UK satirical magazine Judy as the true catalyst of "cold turkey"'s evolution in meaning. The journal's issue of January 3, 1877, featured the fictional diary of one John Humes, Esquire. The diary's transcript on the day in question details Mr Humes' exploits over his Christmas holiday. Throughout, Humes demonstrates a humbug attitude, complaining to every shopkeeper and acquaintance about the irony of the words "merry" and "jolly" being attached to the season. Most significantly, Hume is invited to stay at his cousin Clara's as a part of her household's celebrations. Hume, the miser to the core, is shocked that Clara serves him slices of (literal) cold turkey with his pudding and other side dishes on the evening of his arrival. A poor substitute for the roasted and dressed kind of turkey is the continually played-up implication in the comedy piece. The dissatisfied barrister stays several days nonetheless, and with each passing day, he is more and more shocked that the cold turkey finds its way onto his plate again. Finally, Hume arrives home, utterly disgusted at having been treated so badly. He calls for his estate lawyer and chops Clara completely out of his will and testament.

The hypothesis posited by researchers is that word quickly spread from London to the rest of Britain, and finally the U.S., about Hume's having given Clara "the cold turkey treatment," as in excluding and excommunicating someone (taking Clara out of his will) in order to exact revenge for the person's ongoing ill-treatment of oneself (the repeated serving of the cold turkey).

The next known earliest print appearance of "cold turkey" in its exclusionary sense dates to 1910, in Canadian poet Robert W. Service's The Trail of '98: A Northland Romance: "Once I used to gamble an' drink the limit. One morning I got up from the card-table after sitting there thirty-six hours. I'd lost five thousand dollars. I knew they'd handed me out 'cold turkey'..."

Another possible origin relates to the American phrase talk turkey, meaning "to speak bluntly with little preparation". The phrase "taking cold turkey" has also been reported during the 1920s as slang for pleading guilty.

The term is also attributed to piloerection or "goose bumps" that occurs with abrupt withdrawal from opioids, which resembles the skin of a plucked refrigerated turkey. However, the term was used in other contexts before being used to describe withdrawal. The similar term "kick the habit" alludes to the muscle spasms that occur in addition to goosebumps in some cases.

A term appears in its contemporary usage in a December 1920 New York City medical bulletin:
Another early printed use, this one in the media to refer to drug withdrawal occurred in the Daily Colonist in British Columbia in 1921:

See also 

 Smoking cessation
 Drug withdrawal
 Delirium tremens

References 

Drug rehabilitation
Substance dependence
Slang